The NCAA Skiing Championships are held annually to crown the National Collegiate Athletic Association combined men's and women's team skiing champion. Before 1983, the championship was only for men's skiing. Unlike many NCAA sports, only one National Collegiate championship is held each season with teams from Division I, Division II, and Division III competing together.

The University of Denver has won a record 24 team titles, including ten since 2000. The University of Colorado is second with 20 titles (plus one AIAW title), and the University of Utah is third with 14  (plus one AIAW title).

Denver won the first NCAA championship in 1954 at Reno with 384 points, 34.4 points ahead of runner-up Seattle University. The scoring system has been modified over the years; in 2012, Vermont scored a record 832 points, with a record margin of 161 points over second-place Utah.

The 2020 edition started on schedule, but was canceled in progress due to the COVID-19 pandemic.

Team champions

Titles by team

Individual Winners

Women's Alpine 

4 wins: Kristine Gjelsten Haugen (GS: 2013, 2014, 2016; SL: 2013). 8 All American honors (4x1st, 2x3rd, 1x5th and 1x6th).
3 wins: Malin Hemmingsson (SL: 2007, 2009, 2010); Anke Friedrich (GS: 1989, 1990; SL: 1990); Christl Hager (GS: 1994, 1995, 1997); Lucie Zikova (GS: 2008; SL: 2006, 2008); Amelia Smart (GS: 2018; SL: 2018, 2021).
6 sweeps (GS and SL in same year): Bente Dahlum (1984), Anke Friedrich (1990), Lucie Zikova (2008), Kristine Gjelsten Haugen (2013), Amelia Smart (2018), and Laurence St. Germain (2019).

Men's Alpine 

6 wins - Chiharu Igaya (1955–57)
5 wins - Otto Tschudi (1970–72)
4 wins - Buddy Werner (1961–63), Bill Marolt (1961–63), Mike Porcarelli (1970–72), Peik Christensen (1973–75)

Alpine Sweep (9): Chiharu Igaya (1955), Marvin Melville (1959), Joch Clough (1964), Otto Tschudi (1971), Stephen Heinzsch (1977), John Skajem (1987), Adam Cole (2007), John Buchar (2008), David Ketterer (2017)

Men's Nordic

4 Wins - Thorodd Bakken, Vermont (1996–98)
Nordic Sweeps: Egil Nilssen (1982), John Aalberg (1984), Hans Martin Sjulstad (1986), Osmund Driveness (1987), Per Kare Jakobsen (1988), Thorod Bakken (1998), Pietro Broggini (2000), Ola Berger (2002), Henning Dybendel (2004), Rene Reisshauer (2005), Mads Stroem (2016), Martin Bergstrom (2017), Magnus Boee (2021)

Women's Nordic

4 Wins - Laura Wilson (1990–91), Katerina Hanusova, 2000–02), Antje Maempel (2009-10)
Nordic Sweeps: Brenda White (1988), Sari Argillander (1989), Laura Wilson (1990, 1991), Heidi Selnes (1995), Lisbeth Johnson (1996), Line Selnes (1998), Katerina Hanusova (2000), Mandy Kaempf (2005), Jana Rehemaa (2006), Maria Grevsgaard (2008), Antje Maempel (2009, 2010), Petra Hyncicova (2017), Katharine Ogden (2018), Sydney Palmer-Leger (2021)

Men's Combined 
All four events (Cross Country, Downhill, Jumping, Slalom)

Hosts

Host sites, by school (Includes co-hosts)

Non-School Hosts: 1966-69, 1971, 1980, 1983

Host sites, by location

Individual events

Current events

Cross-Country events
20-Kilometer Freestyle, Men 
10-Kilometer Freestyle, Men
15-Kilometer Freestyle, Women
5-Kilometer Freestyle, Women
10-Kilometer Classical, Men
20-Kilometer Classical, Men
5-Kilometer Classical, Women
15-Kilometer Classical, Women

Downhill Events
Men's Slalom (1954–present)
Women's Slalom (1983–present)
Men's Giant Slalom (1976–present)
Women's Giant Slalom (1983–present)

Discontinued events

Cross-country events
Cross-country, Men (1954–1988)
Cross-country, Women (1983–1988)
Cross-country relay, Men (1983–1988)
Cross-country relay, Women (1983–1988)

Alpine events
Alpine combined, Men (1955–1976)
Downhill, Men (1954–1975)

Other events
Nordic combined, Men (1955–1976)
Ski jumping, Men (1954–1980)
Skimeister, Men (1954–1973)

Individual Championships
Results through 2021

Championships by coach
Results through 2022, no team title awarded in 2020 due to COVID-19 pandemic in the United States

See also

List of NCAA skiing programs
AIAW Intercollegiate Women's Skiing Champions
Pre-NCAA Intercollegiate Skiing Champions

References

External links
NCAA sports Skiing

 
Skiing competitions in the United States
College skiing in the United States
Recurring sporting events established in 1954
1954 establishments in Nevada